"He'll Have to Go" is an American country and pop hit recorded on October 15, 1959, by Jim Reeves. The song, released in the fall of 1959, went on to become a hit in both genres early in 1960.

Background
The song is about a man who's talking by telephone to the woman he loves, when he realizes that another man is with her. The song was written by the husband-and-wife team of Joe and Audrey Allison, and was inspired by a phone conversation between them in which they had trouble making themselves understood. Because of background noise and Audrey Allison's naturally soft voice, her husband had to ask her to put her mouth very close to the receiver. That led her to pen the song's first line.

Reeves recorded the song after listening to the original version of it by singer Billy Brown. When Brown's version attracted little attention, Reeves felt free to record his own. It was released to country radio as the B-side of "In a Mansion Stands My Love", which some music executives considered a stronger song. However, "Mansion" failed to catch on, and disc jockeys began playing the B-side instead. It was not long before "He'll Have to Go" became a huge country and pop hit. Several rhythm and blues radio stations played the song, too.

The recording features a small group of musicians: Floyd Cramer on piano, Marvin Hughes on the vibraphone, Bob Moore on bass, Buddy Harman on drums, Hank Garland on guitar, and the Anita Kerr Singers providing the background vocals.

The first verse set the tone: "Put your sweet lips a little closer to the phone/Let's pretend that we're together all alone/I'll tell the man to turn the juke box way down low/And you can tell your friend there with you he'll have to go."

Country music historian Bill Malone noted that "He'll Have to Go" in most respects represented a conventional country song, but its arrangement and the vocal chorus "put this recording in the country pop vein." In addition, Malone lauded Reeves' vocal styling - lowered to "its natural resonant level" to project the "caressing style that became famous" - as being why "many people refer to him as the singer with the velvet touch."

Chart performance
In 1960, the song reached number 2 on the Billboard Hot 100 in early 1960, kept from the top spot by Percy Faith's "Theme from A Summer Place". Billboard ranked it as the number 2 song of the year for 1960."He'll Have to Go" reached number 1 on the Hot Country Singles  chart on February 8, 1960, where it remained for 14 consecutive weeks. The song was one of just five different titles to occupy the chart's summit during 1960. In addition, it reached number 13 on the R&B Singles Chart.

In Canada, the song was number 1 for six weeks in the pop charts. It also had success abroad, reaching number 1 on the Australian Singles Chart and number 12 on the UK Singles Chart.

All-time charts

Later versions and answer songs
"He'll Have to Go" has been recorded by many other artists. Elvis Presley recorded his version of "He'll Have to Go" on October 31, 1976, at his last known studio recording session; it is believed to be the final song he ever recorded in a studio setting.

The song prompted the answer song "He'll Have to Stay" by Jeanne Black. Her song reached No. 6 on the Billboard Hot C&W Sides chart and No. 4 on the Billboard Hot 100 later in 1960.

Guitarist Ry Cooder recorded a version with a Mexican Norteño-style arrangement for his 1976 album Chicken Skin Music. The song has also been covered by Joe Pesci, Scottish rocker Frankie Miller, English pop band Prefab Sprout and English rock band the Quireboys.

Solomon Burke had a crossover hit with his 1964 version of the song on the US adult contemporary and R&B charts.

UB40 recorded the song on their 2013 album Getting Over the Storm.

References

1959 singles
1960 singles
RCA Victor singles
Elvis Presley songs
Jim Reeves songs
Number-one singles in Australia
Number-one singles in Canada
Number-one singles in Norway
Grammy Hall of Fame Award recipients
Song recordings produced by Chet Atkins
Songs about telephone calls
Songs written by Joe Allison
1959 songs
1950s ballads